"Unstable" is the first single released from the Adema album, Unstable. It is featured in Madden NFL 2004

Success 
10,000 copies of this single were sold in the first three weeks, making it Adema's second most successful single to date, bar "Giving In". This song is also one of Adema's most popular songs among fans, being one of the songs played at almost every show. The song is also featured on the soundtrack of Madden NFL 2004.

Music video 
The music video depicts the band playing in a desert like location, with sandy gusts of wind billowing around them. The video occasionally cuts away to Mark Chavez, the lead vocalist, as he runs through a windy location, storm clouds everywhere, with a female floating around him. In the end, Chavez is lying on a roof protected from the wind. He reaches out to try and catch the female from drifting away. In the end of the video, the house that Mark was lying on explodes, and quick-cuts of Mark Chavez and the woman holding hands are shown.

The video was shot in a week, and has had the highest airplay out of all of Adema's singles to date. This is the last music video to feature its full original lineup with Chavez and Ransom departing from the band after its release and then again after their reunion, although they returned to the band in March 2017.  It was directed by Kevin Kerslake.

Track listing 
CD 1
1. "Unstable"
2. "Immortal"
3. "Giving In"

CD 2
1. "Unstable"
2. "Someone Elses Lies"
3. "Promises" (Acoustic Version)
4. "Unstable" (Video)

References 

2003 singles
Adema songs
2003 songs
Arista Records singles